Bangalow is a small town in the Northern Rivers region of New South Wales, Australia in Byron Shire. The town's name appears to have been derived from an Aboriginal word, "Bangalla", said to mean 'a low hill' or 'a kind of palm tree'.

History
Bangalow's historic streetscape, monthly market and proximity to the popular tourist resort of Byron Bay has increased its appeal as a tourist destination. Timber cutters established a camp on the banks of Byron Creek in the 1840s but it was not until the 1880s that a town appeared on the site. The town was known as Bangaloe until 1907, when the modern spelling came into use.

In recent years Bangalow has become a pleasant stop for holiday-makers and day-trippers as its main street is lined with modern cafes and boutique-shops.  
Organic produce grown nearby is a regular feature in the cafes, in particular the Byron Bay coffee-beans are a popular purchase.

Bangalow Public School was first built in 1884. In 1925, a 4 classroom brick building block was made. 
The Bangalow Uniting Church was rebuilt in the early 1900s after a tornado blew down the original (Methodist) church. The church congregation is still active.

Events
Bangalow is also home to the Bangalow Billy Cart Derby, which is held each year. It is a fun day, when the school has its fundraiser "The Mad Hatter's Teaparty".

Population
The next most common country of birth was England at 5.6%.  87.4% of people only spoke English at home. The most common responses for religion were No Religion 48.3%, Catholic 15.8% and Anglican 10.9%.

Gallery

References

External links
Byron Shire Council homepage
Bangalow Chamber of Commerce and Visitor Information
Bangalow information site
Town information from the Sydney Morning Herald
VISITNSW.com - Bangalow

Towns in New South Wales
Northern Rivers